Diaphorus nigricans is a species of long-legged fly in the family Dolichopodidae. It is found in the Holarctic realm, south to the Neotropics.

References

Diaphorinae
Articles created by Qbugbot
Insects described in 1824
Taxa named by Johann Wilhelm Meigen
Diptera of Europe
Diptera of Asia
Diptera of North America
Diptera of South America